Bradfield Abbey was an Anglo-Saxon abbey in Berkshire, England.

A charter, from Ine of Wessex, of doubtful authenticity, was for a monastery at Bradfield.

References

Monasteries in Berkshire
Anglo-Saxon monastic houses
West Berkshire District